The Arboretum du Ruscas is an arboretum located in the Domaine de Ruscas (Forêt du Dom) in Bormes-les-Mimosas, Var, Provence-Alpes-Côte d'Azur, France. The arboretum was created in 1977, and contains 15 specimens representing 11 varieties of trees including Pinus radiata and Quercus ithaburensis.

See also 
 List of botanical gardens in France

References 
 Bruno Fady and Jean Thevenet, Les arboretums: un outil de recherche et d'éducation sur la biodiversité forestière : Le cas de l'arboretum du Ruscas, Forêt méditerranéenne, 2006, vol. 27, no3, pp. 235–246. ISSN 0245-484X.
 Bruno Fady, M. Arbez, P. Fernandès, "Variability of Juvenile Greek Firs and Stability of Characteristics with Age", Silvae Genetica, 40, 3/4, 1991.
 Confrérie des Planteurs de Fruitiers Rares : Article 33, page 2. (French)
 Stéphanie Brachet, "Creation of a French network of Arboreta to improve the coordination of ex situ resources" (French)
 Observatoire Marin: Arboretum du Ruscas dans la forêt du Dom - La Môle (French)

Ruscas, Arboretum du
Ruscas, Arboretum du